Simga is a town and a nagar panchayat in Baloda bazar district in the Indian state of Chhattisgarh.it is between raipur and bilaspur NH 130.

Geography
It has an average elevation of 262 metres (859 feet).

Demographics
 India census, Simga had a population of 13,137. Males constitute 50% of the population and females 50%. Simga has an average literacy rate of 60%, higher than the national average of 59.5%: male literacy is 71%, and female literacy is 48%. In Simga, 16% of the population is under 6 years of age.

References

Cities and towns in Raipur district